Daniel Lachezarov Nikolov (born 26 August 1998) is a Bulgarian badminton player. He was awarded 2017 Haskovo Sportsman of the Year. Nikolov competed at the 2019 European Games.

Achievements

BWF International Challenge/Series (8 titles, 4 runners-up) 
Men's singles

Men's doubles

  BWF International Challenge tournament
  BWF International Series tournament
  BWF Future Series tournament

References

External links 
 

1998 births
Living people
People from Haskovo
Bulgarian male badminton players
Badminton players at the 2019 European Games
European Games competitors for Bulgaria
Sportspeople from Haskovo Province
21st-century Bulgarian people